Holzwickede is a municipality in the district of Unna in North Rhine-Westphalia, Germany.

It is twinned with Weymouth, Louviers and Colditz.

Mayors 
1969–1975: Josef Wortmann
1975–1989: Heinrich Schürhoff
1989–1999: Margret Mader
1999–2015: Jenz Rother
 since 2015: Ulrike Drossel

People from Holzwickede 
 Julius Bergmann (1839-1904), philosopher
 Hermann Mandel (1882-1946), theologian
 Hermann Strathmann (1882-1966), theologian and politician
 Nils Mönkemeyer (born 1978), violist and academic teacher

References 

Unna (district)